The following is a list of English-language game shows that air or have aired in Canada.

0–9
5-4-3-2-Run (1988–1990)

A
Acting Crazy (1991–1994)
All About Faces (1971–1972)
Anything You Can Do (1971–1974)
Are You Smarter than a Canadian 5th Grader? (2007)

B
Beat the Clock (1970–1974)
Because News (2015–present)
Beyond Reason (1977–1980)
Bluff (1976–1977)
Bowling for Dollars (1960–2008)
Brain Battle (2007–2008)
Bumper Stumpers (1987–1990)

C
Cache Craze (2013–2014)
Cash Cab (2008–present)
Chain Reaction (1986–1991)
Clips (1992–1996)
Cooking for Love (2000)
Communicate (1966–1967)
Crossword Quiz (1952–1953)

D
Deal or No Deal Canada (2007)
Definition (1974–1989)
Designer Superstar Challenge (2003–2006)
Detective Quiz (1952)
Double Up (1974)

E
Eye Bet (1971)

F
Fighting Words (1952–1962, 1970, 1982)
Flashback (1962–1968)
Food For Thought (1989-1993)
Fort Boyard (1993–2001)
Front Page Challenge (1957–1995)
Family Feud Canada (2019–present)

G
Game Gurus (2007–2008)
Game On (1998–2000)
Generation Gap (1989)
Go (2002–2010)
Guess What (1983–1987)
Gutterball Alley (2001-2002)

H
Handyman Superstar Challenge (2006–present)
Headline Hunters (1972–1983)

I
Ice Cold Cash (2012)
If You Crave Chocolate Too (1987–?)
Inside the Box (2006–2008)
Instant Cash (2011–present)
It's Your Move (1964–1967, 1974–1979)

J
Jackpot (1985–1988)
Japanizi: Going, Going, Gong! (2013–2014)
The Joke's on Us (1983–1984)
Just for Fun (1975–1976)
Just Like Mom (1980–1985)
Just Like Mom and Dad (2018-2019)

K
Kidstreet (1988–1992)
A Kin to Win (1961–1964)

L
The Last Word (1989–1990)
Let's Make a Deal (1980–1981)
Lingo (1987–1988)
Live a Borrowed Life (1959–1962)
Love Handles (1996–1998)
Love Me, Love Me Not (1986–1987)

M
The Mad Dash (1978–1981)
Make a Match (1954–1955)
Massive Monster Mayhem (2017–present)
Match Game (2012–present)
The Moneymakers (1969)
Mr. and Mrs. (1963–1966)

N
The New Liar's Club (1988–1989)
The New Quiz Kids (1978–1979)
The Next Line (1991)

P
Party Game (1970–1981)
Pay Cards! (1973–1975)
Pitfall (1981–1982)
Puppet People (1973–1975)

Q
Qubit (2009–2010)

R
Reach for the Top (1961–1985)

S
Second Honeymoon (1987–1988)
Showdown (1961–1962)
SmartAsk (2001–2004)
Spin Off (2013)
Split Second (1986–1987)
Strategy (1969)
Super Pay Cards! (1981–1982)
The Superior Sex (1961)
Supermarket Sweep (1992–1995)
Superstar Hair Challenge (2007–present)
Supertown Challenge (1998–2000)
Surprise! It's Edible Incredible! (2004–2009, 2011)

T
Take a Chance (1961–1965)
Take Your Choice (1960–1971)
Talk About (1989–1990)
Test Pattern (1989–1991)
This Is the Law (1971–1976)
TimeChase (1997–1999)
TimeShift Trivia (2008)
To Tell the Truth (1962–1964)
Twenty Questions (1961–1962)

U
Uh Oh! (1997–2003)
University Challenge (1970–1971)

V
Video & Arcade Top 10 (1991–2006)

W
What on Earth? (1971–1975)
What's the Good Word? (1972–1976)
Who Knows? (1959)
Who Wants to Be a Millionaire: Canadian Edition (2000)
Wild Guess (1988)
Words and Music (1966–1967)

Y
You Bet Your Ass (2005–2007)

Z
Zoink'd (2012–2013)

See also
List of French-language Canadian game shows
List of American game shows
List of British game shows
List of Australian game shows
Game show
List of international game shows
List of television programs
UKGameshows.com (a British website devoted to reviews and descriptions of game shows)
Game Show Network (an American television channel devoted to game shows)
GameTV (a Canadian television channel devoted to game shows)
Challenge (a British television channel devoted to game shows)
Nickelodeon GAS (a defunct television channel devoted to airing Nickelodeon game shows)

References

External links
GSN
Challenge
Game TV
UKGameshows
BonusRound.ca Canadian Game Show Streaming Service

English
Candian, English-lang